Light Up the Night is a song by Irish boy band Boyzone from their fifth studio album, BZ20 (2013). The song was written by Josh Kear and Ed Hill, and was produced by Brian Rawling, Paul Meehan, and Matt Furmidge. It was released in February 2014 as the album's second and final singe.

Promotion
Boyzone performed the song on German TV channel Sat.1 on the 24 January 2014.

Music video
On 15 January 2014, the music video was uploaded to YouTube. The video features Boyzone singing around a bonfire.

Track listing
CD single
"Light Up the Night" (radio mix)

References

2014 singles
Boyzone songs
Pop ballads
2014 songs
Songs written by Josh Kear
Songs written by Ed Hill
Song recordings produced by Brian Rawling